Rodney Hall AM (born 18 November 1935) is an Australian writer.

Biography

Born in Solihull, Warwickshire, England, Hall came to Australia as a child after World War II and studied at the University of Queensland (1971). In the 1960s Hall began working as a freelance writer, and a book and film reviewer. He also worked as an actor, and was often engaged by the Australian Broadcasting Commission in Brisbane. Between 1967 and 1978 he was the Poetry Editor of The Australian. He began publishing poetry in the 1970s and has since published thirteen novels, including Just Relations and The Island in the Mind. He lived in Shanghai for a period in the late 1980s. From 1991 to 1994, he served as chair of the Australia Council.

Hall lives in Victoria. In addition to a number of literary awards such as twice winning the Miles Franklin Award, he was appointed a Member of Order of Australia for "service to the Arts, particularly in the field of literature" in 1990.

Hall's memoir Popeye Never Told You was launched in May 2010 and was published by Pier 9.

He was co-founder of the Australian Summer School of Early Music in Canberra. In June 2014 he staged Jacopo Peri's opera Euridice at the Woodend Winter Arts Festival.

Awards

Bibliography

Novels
 The Ship on the Coin: A Fable of the Bourgeoisie (1972)
 A Place Among People (1975)
 Just Relations (1982)
 Kisses of the Enemy (1987)
 Captivity Captive (1988) - third book in the Yandilli trilogy
 The Second Bridegroom (1991) - first book in the Yandilli trilogy
 The Grisly Wife (1993) - second book in the Yandilli trilogy
 The Island in the Mind (1996)
 The Day We Had Hitler Home (2000)
 The Last Love Story (2004)
 Love Without Hope (2007)
 A Stolen Season (2018)

Short fiction 
Collections
 Silence (2011)

Poetry 
Collections
 The Climber (1962)
 Penniless Till Doomsday (1962)
 Forty Beads on a Hangman's Rope (1963)
 Eyewitness (1967)
 The Autobiography of a Gorgon (1968)
 The Law of Karma (1968)
 Australia (1970)
 Heaven, In a Way (1970)
 A Soapbox Omnibus (1973)
 Selected Poems (1975)
 Black Bagatelles (1978)
 The Most Beautiful World (1981)
 The Owner of My Face: New and Selected Poems (2002)
Anthologies (edited)
 New Impulses in Australian Poetry (1968) with Thomas Shapcott
 Australian Poetry 1970 (1970)
 Poems from Prison (1973)
 Australians Aware (1975) (a collection of poems and paintings)
 Voyage into Solitude (1978) (a collection of Michael Dransfield poetry)
 The Second Month of Spring (1980) (a collection of Michael Dransfield poetry)
 The Collins Book of Australian Poetry (1981)
 Michael Dransfield Collected Poems (1987)
List of poems

Non-fiction
 Focus on Andrew Sibley (1968)
 J. S. Manifold: An Introduction to the Man and His Work (1978)
 Australia - Image of a Nation 1850-1950 (1983) (the text of a photographic collection)
 Home: Journey Through Australia (1988)
 Abolish the States!  (1998)
Memoirs
 Popeye Never Told You (2010)

References

Further reading

1935 births
Living people
20th-century Australian novelists
21st-century Australian novelists
ALS Gold Medal winners
Australian male novelists
Australian poets
English emigrants to Australia
Meanjin people
Members of the Order of Australia
Miles Franklin Award winners
People from Birmingham, West Midlands